The San Diego Bayfair Cup is an H1 Unlimited hydroplane boat race held annually in September on Mission Bay in San Diego, California. The race was run as part of the APBA Gold Cup in 1969, 1970, 1987, and 1989. The race is the main attraction of the annual San Diego Bayfair festival in mid September.

List of San Diego Unlimited Hydroplane Champions

References

External links

San Diego Bayfair website
H1 Unlimited website

Sports competitions in San Diego
H1 Unlimited
Motorboat races
Annual sporting events in the United States
Recurring sporting events established in 1964
1964 establishments in California